Arthur Gregor (1890–1948) was an Austrian-born American playwright and film director.

Selected filmography
 The Count of Luxembourg (1926)
 Say It with Diamonds (1927)
 Women's Wares (1927)
 Phyllis of the Follies (1928)
 The Scarlet Dove (1928)
 What Price Decency (1933)

Bibliography
 Goble, Alan. The Complete Index to Literary Sources in Film. Walter de Gruyter, 1999.

References

External links

1890 births
1948 deaths
American film directors
Austrian film directors
Austrian emigrants to the United States
Film people from Vienna